Alex McKenna is an American actress and voice-over artist. She gained fame by playing Petunia Stupid in The Stupids (1996) and Mickey Apple in You Wish (1997). She resumed her acting career with guest appearances in CW hit teen drama series 90210 in 2010. In 2012, she had recurring appearances in the television series, including Dallas, Guys with Kids and Two and a Half Men. McKenna is also known for her role as Sadie Adler in the video game Red Dead Redemption 2 (2018).

Career
McKenna began her career as a child actress, portraying Petunia Stupid in the adventure comedy film The Stupids (1996). She had roles as Amanda in the horror film Campfire Tales (1997) and as Linda Ross in Joey (1997). In 1998, she was nominated for Best Performance in a TV Comedy Series (You Wish) in Young Artist Awards. She had a small role as Alex's friend in the comedy film What Women Want (2000). The film earned $374 million worldwide, and received largely positive reviews. She portrayed a drug-addicted teenager Abby Macy in NBC's crime drama series Crossing Jordan. She appeared in several guest starring television roles, including 90210, Malcolm In the Middle, Shake It Up, Common Law, Two and a Half Men, Guys with Kids and Boston Public.

In 2009, she played the lead role of Megs in short film The City of Lights. Next McKenna landed a recurring role in the TNT revival of the CBS prime-time soap opera, Dallas. In 2014, she appeared in the horror film Haunted along with Luke Kleintank and Lesley-Anne Down. She had a supporting role as Tammy in Bear with Us (2016). The film also earned McKenna numerous awards, including Jury Award for Best Supporting Actress at Sunscreen Film Festival. She appeared opposite Josh Radnor in the drama film The Seeker (2016), portraying Grace. In 2018, she starred in the video game Red Dead Redemption 2 as the voice and motion capture actress of Sadie Adler, and she made a guest appearance on an episode of drama thriller television series Quantico in the episode "Heaven's Fall".

Personal life 
McKenna married Canadian actor Joshua Close in August 2016 in Calistoga, California.

Filmography

Film

Television

Video games

Awards and nominations

References

External links

Living people
Actresses from Los Angeles
American child actresses
American film actresses
American television actresses
Television personalities from Los Angeles
American voice actresses
20th-century American actresses
21st-century American actresses
Year of birth missing (living people)